was a Japanese pop group that formed and debuted in the late 1970s.  They released their first single, Triangle Love Letter in mid 1978 and their last single, Koi wa Tekkiri Ba-Bi-Bu-Be-Bo in 1980.  The group only released two albums, Triangle Love Letter and Sanjūsō / Triangle 2 in 1978 and 1979 respectively.  Sony Music Entertainment released Triangle Single Collection in 2008.

Members
 Mitchi (Mori Mitsuko →  Komori Michiko)
 Mami (Mami → Ueno Mayumi Ueno)
 Kūko (Ōtsuka Kuniko) left the group in 1979
 Aki (Kei Aki Katō) joined the group in 1979

Discography

Singles
 Triangle Love Letter (c/w "San Shoku no Niji") [1978.04.21]
 0 no Meruhen (c/w "Dreaming") [1978.07.21]
 Captain Zap (c/w "Tatchi Auto")[1978.10.01]
 Love Locomotion (c/w "Kokoro no Todokanu Love Letter") [1979]
 Fuyu ga Chikai (c/w "Kyanpasu") [1979]
 Honjitsu Seiten Nari! (c/w "Wet Boy")[1980]
 Koi wa Tekkiri Ba.Bi.Bu.Be.Bo (c/w "Gyangu ga Machi ni Yatte kita") [1980.09.21]

Albums
 Triangle Love Letter
 Sanjūsō / Triangle 2
 Triangle Single Collection

Japanese pop music groups
Japanese idol groups
Japanese girl groups